Euphorbia benoistii is a species of plant in the family Euphorbiaceae. It is endemic to Madagascar.  It is threatened by habitat loss.

References

Endemic flora of Madagascar
benoistii
Vulnerable plants
Taxonomy articles created by Polbot
Taxobox binomials not recognized by IUCN